M.F. Horn Two is a 1972 big band jazz album by Canadian jazz trumpeter Maynard Ferguson. It features cover versions of many songs that were popular in the years leading up to its production, including: "Theme from Shaft" by Isaac Hayes, "Country Road" by James Taylor, "Mother" by John Lennon, "Spinning Wheel" by David Clayton-Thomas and "Hey Jude" by The Beatles. It also features a track called "Free Wheeler" written by another highly regarded jazz trumpeter and flugelhorn player, Kenny Wheeler.

Reviews

"His trumpet playing is frequently brilliant throughout this LP with his English orchestra but not too many jazz purists will be thrilled by his renditions of (popular songs)…"

Reissues
M.F. Horn Two was reissued on CD in 2007 on Wounded Bird 3170.

Track listing

Musicians
 Maynard Ferguson: Leader, trumpet, flugelhorn, valve trombone
 Trumpets: John Donnelly, Martin Drover, Alan Downey, Mike Bailey, Bud Parks
 Trombones: Billy Graham, Adrian Drover, Norman Fripp, Derek Wadsworth
 Saxes: Jeff Daly, Brian Smith, Bob Sydor, Bob Watson, Stan Robinson
 Drums: Randy Jones
 Bass/Bass Guitar: Dave Lynane
 Piano/Electric Piano: Pete Jackson
 Percussion: Ray Cooper, Harold Fisher

Production
Keith Mansfield –Producer
Mike Smith –Executive producer
Adrian Kerridge–Recording Engineer
Mike Ross/David Baker/Adrian Kerridge –Re-Mix Engineers
Karenlee Grant/John Berg –Cover Design
Bob Monroe –Photo interpretations
Ernie Garside –Sleeve notes, contracting-co-ordination
Recorded at Landsdowne Studios, London

References

1972 albums
Big band albums
Columbia Records albums
Maynard Ferguson albums